Florian Jaritz (born 18 October 1997) is an Austrian professional footballer who plays as a winger for Austria Klagenfurt.

Career
Jaritz is a youth product of SV Moosburg, FC Carinthia, Austria Kärnten, Austria Klagenfurt, and Wolfsberger AC. He began his senior career with Austria Klagenfurt in 2016, and helped the club get promoted from the Austrian Regionalliga to the Austrian Football Bundesliga. He made his professional debut with Austria Klagenfurt in a 4–1 2. Liga loss to Kapfenberger SV on 1 April 2016. On 23 May 2022, he extended his contract to 2024 with the club.

Personal life
Jaritz is a fan of the German club Borussia Dortmund.

References

External links
 
 OEFB Profile

1997 births
Living people
Sportspeople from Klagenfurt
Footballers from Carinthia (state)
Austrian footballers
SK Austria Klagenfurt players
Austrian Football Bundesliga players
2. Liga (Austria) players
Austrian Regionalliga players
Association football wingers